The Northern Territory Police Force is the police body that has legal jurisdiction over the Northern Territory of Australia. This police service has 1,537 police members (as at 31 July 2019) made up of 79 senior sergeants, 228 sergeants, 839 constables, 208 auxiliaries, and 73 Aboriginal Community Police Officers. The rest of the positions are members of commissioned rank and inoperative positions (as of 31 July 2019). It also has a civilian staff working across the NT Police, Fire and Emergency Services.

Police in the Northern Territory are part of a tri-service: the Northern Territory Police, Fire and Emergency Services with the Commissioner of Police as the CEO of the tri-service.

History

The Northern Territory Police traces its roots back to the South Australian Mounted Police from 1870 when Inspector Paul Foelsche and six other police officers arrived in the Territory. A small rural constabulary (part-time force) had existed earlier but was disbanded. The Native Police Corps was formed in 1884. Their role was mostly as a security force to protect the early inhabitants of the Northern Territory than as a police force. The current NTP came into existence in 1911. In 1931, the two Territories Central and Northern became the Northern Territory of Australia and the authority of the Commissioner of Police was established in the Administrator of the Northern Territory, in Darwin.

In December 1869, the governor commissioned Paul Foelsche, a Corporal in the SA Mounted Police stationed at Strathalbyn, to be the first sub-inspector of police at Palmerston. He sailed for Darwin soon afterwards. The police uniform then worn in the Territory was the same as that worn in South Australia. It consisted of a short cut-away blue serge tunic with nine regulation buttons, silver twisted cord shoulder knots, black braid on the sleeves and silver chevrons for non-commissioned officers. The riding breeches were dark blue corkscrew serge with a white stripe.

The earliest firearms used were Snider–Enfield rifles and carbines firing a .577 calibre cartridge. Later, Martini–Henry rifles were used, and Webley revolvers were issued. Like their predecessors, the Rural Constabulary at Escape Cliffs, the first detachment of police at Palmerston had as their first responsibility the maintenance of law and order in the community.

The police were frequently engaged following the discovery of gold near Pine Creek in 1872. Stations were established at Adelaide River, Yam Creek, Pine Creek, Roper River and later at Daly River. The first police fatality occurred in 1872 when Mounted Constable Davis, a noted swimmer, disobeyed a local Standing Order and swam in the sea. He was killed by a crocodile. The inspector lived nearby in three rooms. A small stone building with two cells was the accommodation for those in custody. These are now incorporated in the Administrator's offices on the Esplanade.

In Central Australia the police were part of the South Australian Mounted Police. Mounted Constable Shirley was the first mounted trooper in charge at Alice Springs (first called Stuart). At one time there were two Commissioners of Police in the Northern Territory: one for the Territory of North Australia and one for the Territory of Central Australia. In 1931, the two Territories became the Northern Territory of Australia and the authority of the Commissioner of Police was vested in the Administrator of the Northern Territory, in Darwin.

On 1 July 1964, Clive William Graham, a police officer of long standing in the Territory, was appointed as Commissioner and the force as a whole was administered as part of the Public Service of the Northern Territory. In recent years, various cases have made national and international headlines: the end of the Petrov Affair occurred in Darwin; the 1968 month-long bush search for Larry-Boy who murdered his wife and seriously injured a stockman at Elsey Station; and the 1971 attempted hijack of a plane at Alice Springs airport in which a Territory police officer, who was badly wounded, displayed great heroism. Events connected with search and rescue operations at sea, in swamps and the desert have also made the news. Auxiliaries and Aboriginal Community Police Officers. The Joint Emergency Services Communications Centre in Darwin has instant contact with all stations, vehicles, aircraft and vessels and provides for the Police, Fire, Emergency Services and St John Ambulance Service.

Female officers 

Females were accepted as officers prior or from 1960.  In 1962, both male and female candidates had to be unmarried, male applicants aged 21 to 30 years of age, up to 35 years with previous police experience; yet female applicants had to be between 25 and 35 (unless previous police experience). By 1970, only female candidates had to be unmarried.  Believed-to-be Australia's first female police motorcyclist, in April 1980, Constable Kate Vanderlaan rode a Honda 750 cc police special around Darwin.  She later rose to be a deputy commissioner of the force.

Recent history
In 1955, there were 80 police officers. As of June 2011, the number of sworn Police, Auxiliaries and Aboriginal Community Police Officers in the service was 1,381.

In 1989, the Northern Territory Police, Fire and Emergency Services were joined to become a Tri-Service. The Commissioner of Police also becoming the Chief Executive Officer for the Fire and Rescue Service and the Emergency Services.

In July 2019, Commissioner Reece Kershaw was appointed Commissioner of the Australian Federal Police, after being at the helm of NT Police for five years.

In 2012, the colour of the police uniform changed from khaki to blue following a ballot in 2011 in which nearly 60% of officers voted in favour of changing the colour to blue. The roll-out of the new blue uniform, with a new design including the word "Police" displayed on the back of the shirt, started in February 2012 and finished in July 2012.

Organisational structure
 Commissioner: Jamie Chalker
 Deputy Commissioner, Operations: Michael Murphy
 Deputy Commissioner, Investigations and Capability: Michael White (Acting)
 Assistant Commissioner, Crime and Integrity: Nick Anticich
 Assistant Commissioner, Darwin and Support: Vacant
 Assistant Commissioner, Regional Operations: Vacant
 Chief Fire Officer – NT Fire and Rescue Service: Mark Spain
 Chief Officer – NT Emergency Service: Fleur O’Connor
 Executive Director – NT Fire, Rescue and Emergency Services: David Willing
 Chief of Staff: James J O'Brien

Organisation

The headquarters of the Northern Territory Police is located at NAB House on Smith Street, . The Northern Territory Police maintains 63 local police stations and 5 police shopfronts coordinated by their respective Local Area Commands.

A number of specialist units have been established, including the Territory Response Group, Accident Investigation Unit, Computer Crime Unit, Drug Intelligence Unit, Substance Abuse Intelligence Desk (SAID), Indigenous Development Unit, Highway Patrol Unit, Missing Persons Unit, Remote Area Traffic Patrol Unit and Air Support Unit.

Air Wing
The NT Police Air Wing was formed in 1979 with bases in Darwin and Alice Springs, operating two fixed wing aircraft. This around one sixth of the Australian landmass, but is very remote, having less than 200,000 residents (1% of the national population). The commonwealth government funded an extra two planes to be based in Darwin. The planes were later handed back due to lack of money.

CitySafe
The CitySafe and Licensing Patrol Unit was forged during New Year's Eve celebrations in 2008/2009. CitySafe was officially launched by the NT Chief Minister Paul Henderson on 25 February 2009. After this was deemed a success, NT police were looking at establishing a specialist licensing enforcement unit in 2010.

Bottle Shop Security
Police Auxiliaries now guard bottle shops in Katherine, Tennant Creek and Alice Springs. They are called liquor inspectors.

Firearms and equipment
Officers now carry the Glock 22 or the Glock 27 .40-calibre pistol for plain clothes members. Other weapons used in the Northern Territory Police include the AR-15 semi-automatic rifle which is used by specialist groups and specifically trained members in rural areas. Officers also carry Remington model 870 pump action shotgun and Remington model 700 (.308) bolt-action rifle, which is gradually replacing the older BRNO model 601 bolt-action rifles in the same calibre. The NT Police introduced the Model X-26 Advanced TASER into operational service for General Duties members in February 2008, distributing 74 units. The X26 Taser has now been replaced with the Taser X-2. as a less-lethal force option available to each frontline patrol.

Restraints used are ADI Saf-Lok Mark-IV and V handcuffs and Flexi-cuffs. Mk-6 and Mk-9 First Defense oleoresin capsicum (OC) spray are also general issue.

Vehicles

The Northern Territory Police mostly use LAC response vehicles include Ford Falcon sedans, Holden VE Commodore and Toyota Hilux dual cab utes as caged vehicles (4x4 and 2WD) Turbo diesel. Specialist vehicles include the Toyota Land Cruiser 4WD.

Highway Patrol vehicles usually consist of a combination of marked and unmarked Holden VY SS Commodores and Ford Falcon XR6II. Other specialist sections and units use a variety of police vehicles including Isuzu trucks, and fixed wing Pilatus PC-12 aeroplanes.

The Northern Territory police recently acquired Kia stingers to add to their Road Policing Command fleet.

Ranks

Northern Territory Police currently use the following ranks.

Officers killed on duty
 7 November 1883, Mounted Constable John Shirley, aged 27 years from dehydration while searching for men who had murdered a man at Lawson's Creek.
 1 August 1933, mounted constable Albert Stewart McColl was speared to death at Woodah Island in Arnhem Land.
 17 August 1948, Constable Maxwell Gilbert, aged 27 years when the vehicle he was driving overturned just north of Wauchope. He was escorting a prisoner to Alice Springs.
 9 June 1952, constable William Bryan Condon was shot twice after confronting a gunman.
 16 June 1967, inspector Louis Hook died from extensive injuries from a rollover near Pine Creek.
 9 June 1970, sergeant Colin Eckert was killed in a head-on collision in Katherine.
 11 December 1981, senior constable Allen Price aged 44 years died of a heart attack while attempting to stop a disturbance in Mataranka.
 29 January 1984, detective sergeant Ian Bradford died when the police vehicle he was a passenger in went over the edge of the wharf in Darwin.
 3 August 1999, Brevet sergeant Glen Huitson was killed in a gun battle with bushman Rodney Ansell on the Stuart Highway.

Indigenous deaths associated with police contact
 In 1882 Constable Augustus Lucanus and Corporal George Montagu led a punitive expedition where a number of Aboriginal people were shot dead.
 In September of 1884, ex-Constable Augustus Lucanus led a punitive expedition which "dispersed" two large "mobs" of Aboriginal people.
 In 1886 Constable William Curtis led a punitive expedition that resulted in 52 Aboriginal people being shot dead and another 12 falling to their deaths.
 In 1928, the Coniston massacre took place. A number of police officers shot dead dozens of Aboriginal Australians in Coniston. Constable William George Murray, who led the massacre was acquitted. In 2018 the then Commissioner of NT Police Reece Kershaw, issued an apology for the agencies involved in the massacre.
 In 2009 Constables Corey Brown and Jason Mather dragged Aboriginal man Cedric Trigger along a watch-house floor after he had fallen out of the back of their police wagon onto concrete while handcuffed and left him face-down where he died of a subdural haemorrhage.
 In 2012 Constable Gareth Evans dragged Aboriginal man Kwementyaye Briscoe along a watch-house floor, threw him into a counter and left him face-down on a mattress with his neck twisted against a concrete block where he died.
 In 2019 Constable Zachary Brian Rolfe shot dead Kumanjayi Walker after the teenager stabbed Rolfe. Rolfe was later charged with murder with the prosecution arguing that only the first shot was justified and the second and third shots fired by Rolfe were excessive. Rolfe was acquitted of all charges by a jury that found Rolfe was acting in self-defence.

Controversies
On 17 August 1980, an infant Azaria Chamberlain and her family members were camping near Ayers Rock.  It was alleged the girl was snatched away by a dingo, but for a number of reasons, the parents were extradited to the Northern Territory and their vehicle seized. The parents Michael and Lindy Chamberlain were criminally charged and convicted; later overturned in 1988.  A review of the forensic science section, a royal commission, and several inquests were held into the police investigation and cause of Azaria's death.

Commissioners

See also

Crime in the Northern Territory
John William Stokes
James Joseph Mannion
Mark Turner

References

External links

Further reading
 Debnam, Lawrie.(1990) Men of the Northern Territory Police 1870–1914 : who they were and where they were Elizabeth, S. Aust. L. Debnam. 

1911 establishments in Australia
Government agencies established in 1911
Law enforcement agencies of the Northern Territory